The Piano Sonata in B-flat major, K. 498a (Anh. 136), is a piano sonata in four movements. It was first printed in 1798 by P. J. Thonus in Leipzig on behalf of Breitkopf & Härtel and attributed to Wolfgang Amadeus Mozart; an edition printed in c. 1805 already credited it as opus 26 of the Thomascantor August Eberhard Müller (1767–1817). Some publications still attribute it to Mozart, often as Piano Sonata No. 20.

Form

A typical performance lasts for about 19 minutes. The movements are:

The musicologist Alfred Einstein suggested that the Menuetto from this work might be a piano arrangement of the "missing movement" of Mozart's Eine kleine Nachtmusik, K. 525 (1787).

The Andante is an arrangement of the variations movement of the concerto K. 450 in B-flat major, and the Rondo incorporates arrangements of passages from the finales of the B-flat concerti K. 450, K. 456, and K. 595.

Recordings
Vincenzo Balzani: Pagine rare per pianoforte / Wolfgango Amadeo Mozart (1980), Ducale CD 349/350
Transcription for chamber string orchestra recorded by the Hanover Band, Nimbus CD NI5228

See also
Piano Sonata in F major, K. 547a (Mozart)

References

External links

Piano Sonata 498a
Compositions in B-flat major
Compositions by Wolfgang Amadeus Mozart published posthumously
Mozart: spurious and doubtful works